The 1979 Pau Grand Prix was a Formula Two motor race held on 4 June 1979 at the Pau circuit, in Pau, Pyrénées-Atlantiques, France. The Grand Prix was won by Eddie Cheever, driving the Osella FA2/79. Siegfried Stohr finished second and Marc Surer third.

Classification

Race

References

Pau Grand Prix
Pau